"We Can Do Better" is a 2018 song by the American singer-songwriter Matt Simons. Co-written by Matt Simons with Dan Romer, Emily Warren, Scott Harris and produced by Dan Romer and Mike Tuccillo, it became a charting hit single in a number of international charts. An official music video was released for the song.

Charts

Weekly charts

Year-end charts

Certifications

References

2018 songs
2018 singles
Songs written by Emily Warren
Songs written by Scott Harris (songwriter)